The water skiing events at the 2009 World Games in Kaohsiung was played between 22 and 26 July. 81 athletes, from 29 nations, participated in the tournament. The water skiing competition took place at Lotus Pond.

Participating nations

Medal table

Events

Men's events

Women's events

References

External links
 International Waterski and Wakeboard Federation
 Water skiing on IWGA website
 Results

 
2009 World Games
2009